Twenty-three United States Navy submarines are designated as memorials.
Albacore (AGSS-569): Portsmouth, New Hampshire
 Batfish (SS-310): Muskogee, Oklahoma
 Becuna (SS-319): Philadelphia, Pennsylvania
 Blueback (SS-581): Portland, Oregon
 Bowfin (SS-287): Pearl Harbor, Hawaii
 Cavalla (AGSS-244): Galveston, Texas
 Clamagore (SS-343): Patriot's Point (Charleston Harbor), in Mount Pleasant, South Carolina
 Cobia (SS-245): Manitowoc, Wisconsin
 Cod (SS-224): Cleveland, Ohio
 Croaker (SS/SSK-246): Buffalo, New York
 Drum (SS-228): Mobile, Alabama
 Growler (SSG-577): New York City
 Ling (SS-297): Hackensack, New Jersey
 Lionfish (SS-298): Fall River, Massachusetts
 Marlin (SST-2): Omaha, Nebraska
 Nautilus (SSN-571): Groton, Connecticut (first atomic powered submarine, 1954)
 Pampanito (SS-383): San Francisco, California
 Razorback (SS-394): North Little Rock, Arkansas
 Requin (AGSS/SSR-481): Pittsburgh, Pennsylvania
 Silversides (SS-236): Muskegon, Michigan
 Torsk (SS-423): Baltimore Maritime Museum/Historic Ships in Baltimore, Inner Harbor, downtown Baltimore, Maryland (built 1944)
 Intelligent Whale: National Guard Militia Museum of New Jersey, Sea Girt, New Jersey
Fenian Ram: Paterson, New Jersey

Other Navy memorials
United States Navy Memorial#Other Navy memorials

See also
Seawolf Park – a memorial to 
List of submarine museums

Sub

Sub